Oliver Lee Jackson (born 1935) is an American painter, printmaker, sculptor, and educator. He was a professor at the California State University, Sacramento from 1971 until 2002 and was one of the founders of the Pan African Studies program at the school. He lives in Oakland, California.

Early life and education 
He was born in 1935 in St. Louis, Missouri, into an African American family. After graduating from Vashon High School, Jackson attended Illinois Wesleyan University (B.F.A. 1958). He served in the United States Army and was honorably discharged in 1961. After which he attended the University of Iowa (M.F.A. 1963).

Teaching 
In the mid-1960s to late-1970s, he taught art classes at St. Louis local universities and colleges and remained active in this local community.

He taught at St. Louis Community College (1964 to 1967); Southern Illinois University (1967 to 1969); Washington University in St. Louis (1967 to 1969); and Oberlin College (1969 to 1970). In 1971, he moved to California and joined the faculty at California State University, Sacramento, where he remained until 2002.

Art career 
He was an affiliate member of the multidisciplinary arts collective Black Artists Group (BAG) in St. Louis. BAG was founded by musicians, theater artists, dancers and visual artists as a support structure for creative expression among African American artists, and in order to have a greater place in the cultural landscape.

Jackson's paintings are gestural and expressionist in their nature, attempting to capture the mental state. There are a mixture of cultural references and iconography in his paintings including aspects of the African American experience, surrealism, cave paintings, and references to historical African and Oceanian art. The Sharpeville massacre in the 1960s in South Africa was an inspiration for Jackson in his Sharpeville Series (1968–1977).

Jackson’s works are in the museum collections of the Museum of Modern Art; the Metropolitan Museum of Art; the Studio Museum in Harlem; the National Gallery of Art; San Francisco Museum of Modern Art; San Jose Museum of Art; and the Seattle Art Museum.

Exhibitions

Solo 
 1979 – Oliver Jackson, Bixby Gallery, University of Washington, Seattle, Washington
 1993 – Oliver Jackson: Works on Paper, Crocker Art Museum, Sacramento, California
 2019 – Oliver Lee Jackson: Recent Paintings, National Gallery of Art, Washington, D.C.
 2021–2022 – Oliver Lee Jackson: ‘Any Eyes’, di Rosa Center for Contemporary Art, Napa, California
 2021–2022 – Oliver Lee Jackson, Saint Louis Art Museum, Saint Louis, Missouri

Group 
 1976 – Other Sources: An American Essay, curated by Carlos Villa, including Ruth Asawa, Bernice Bing, Rolando Castellón, Claude Clark, Robert Colescott, Frank Day, Rupert García, Mike Henderson, Oliver Jackson, Frank LaPena, Linda Lomahaftewa, George Longfish, Ralph Maradiaga, José Montoya, Manuel Neri, Mary Lovelace O'Neal, Darryl Sapien, Raymond Saunders, James Hiroshi Suzuki, Horace Washington, Al Wong, René Yañez, Leo Valledor, San Francisco Art Institute, San Francisco, California
 1987 – The Ethnic Idea, curated by Andrée Maréchal-Workman, including Lauren Adams, Robert Colescott, Dewey Crumpler, Mildred Howard, Oliver Lee Jackson, Mary Lovelace O'Neal, Joe Sam, Elisabeth Zeilon, Tom Holland, Celeste Conner, Jean LaMarr, Sylvia Lark, Leta Ramos, Judy Foosaner, Joseph Goldyne, Belinda Chlouber, Carlos Villa, Berkeley Art Center, Berkeley, California
 1994 – Continuing the Legacy of the Rockefeller Collection: Recent Acquisitions of 20th Century American Art, including Joan Brown, Wayne Thiebaud, Manuel Neri, Robert Arneson, Oliver Lee Jackson, Frank Lobdell, De Young Museum, San Francisco, California

References

External links 
 Oliver Lee Jackson papers, 1993-2016, from Archives of American Art, Smithsonian Institution

1935 births
Living people
African-American painters
African-American sculptors
African-American printmakers
Artists from St. Louis
Illinois Wesleyan University alumni
University of Iowa alumni
California State University, Sacramento faculty
20th-century American painters
21st-century American painters
20th-century African-American painters
American pan-Africanists
Artists from Oakland, California
Southern Illinois University Edwardsville faculty
Washington University in St. Louis faculty
Oberlin College faculty